Adem is a given name and surname.

Adem may also refer to:

Acronyms
Acute disseminated encephalomyelitis
Alabama Department of Environmental Management

Other uses
Adem (1912 car), an Italian car
Adem Ilhan, an English musician who releases music under the name "Adem"

See also
Adam (disambiguation)